L’Oie de Cravan (translated The Goose of Cravan) is a Canadian publishing house based in Montreal, Quebec that specializes in poetry. It was founded in January 1992 by  poet and writer . The name is seen as a tribute to the poet-boxer Arthur Cravan.
	
The poets published by L’Oie de Cravan are often influenced by the surrealist movement. It has also published the writings of people associated with the music world, such as critic Byron Coley, folk singer Michael Hurley and punk rock icon Mike Watt.

References

External links

L'Oie de Cravan's blog in english

Companies based in Montreal
Book publishing companies of Canada
Publishing companies established in 1992
Culture of Quebec
1992 establishments in Quebec